The Warren Case is a 1934 British crime film directed by Walter Summers and starring Richard Bird, Nancy Burne and Diana Napier. It was made at Welwyn Studios by British International Pictures.

Cast
 Richard Bird as Louis Bevan  
 Nancy Burne as May Clavering  
 Diana Napier as Pauline Warren  
 Edward Underdown as Hugh Waddon  
 Iris Ashley as Elaine de Lisle  
 A. Bromley Davenport as Sir Richard Clavering 
 Barbara Everest
 Francis L. Sullivan

References

Bibliography
 Low, Rachael. Filmmaking in 1930s Britain. George Allen & Unwin, 1985.
 Wood, Linda. British Films, 1927-1939. British Film Institute, 1986.

External links

1934 films
British crime films
1934 crime films
1930s English-language films
Films shot at Welwyn Studios
Films directed by Walter Summers
Films set in London
Films about journalists
British black-and-white films
1930s British films